The 1978 Pepsi Grand Slam, officially the  Pepsi-Cola Grand Slam of Tennis, was a men's tennis tournament played on outdoor green clay courts at the Mission Hills Country Club in Boca Raton, Florida, United States It was an Association of Tennis Professionals (ATP) sanctioned special event that was not part of the 1978 Colgate-Palmolive Grand Prix circuit. It was the third edition of the tournament and was held from January 20 through January 22, 1978.  Björn Borg won his second consecutive singles title at the event and earned $125,000 first prize money..

Final

Singles
 Björn Borg defeated  Jimmy Connors 7–6(7–1), 3–6, 6–1
 It was Borg's 2nd singles title of the year and the 32nd of his career.

Prize money

Draw

Third place match
 Brian Gottfried defeated  Vitas Gerulaitis 6–3, 6–3

See also
 Borg–Connors rivalry

References

External links
 ITF tournament edition details

Pepsi Grand Slam
Pepsi Grand Slam
Pepsi Grand Slam
Pepsi Grand Slam